This is a list of Category A listed buildings in Aberdeen, Scotland.

In Scotland, the term listed building refers to a building or other structure officially designated as being of "special architectural or historic interest".  Category A structures are those considered to be "buildings of national or international importance, either architectural or historic, or fine little-altered examples of some particular period, style or building type". Listing was begun by a provision in the Town and Country Planning (Scotland) Act 1947, and the current legislative basis for listing is the Planning (Listed Buildings and Conservation Areas) (Scotland) Act 1997.  The authority for listing rests with Historic Scotland, an executive agency of the Scottish Government, which inherited this role from the Scottish Development Department in 1991. Once listed, severe restrictions are imposed on the modifications allowed to a building's structure or its fittings. Listed building consent must be obtained from local authorities prior to any alteration to such a structure. There are approximately 47,400 listed buildings in Scotland, of which around 8% (some 3,800) are Category A.

There are 68 Category A listed buildings in the area. Much of the architecture of Aberdeen is built in the distinctive local granite, leading to the nickname, "The Granite City". During the first half of the 19th century, the most prominent architect in Aberdeen was Archibald Simpson (1790–1847), who completed many of the major public buildings in the city. Older buildings include the medieval Brig o' Balgownie and King's College Chapel, and the oldest town houses in the city: Provost Skene's house (1545), and Provost Ross' house (1593). More recently, Sir Robert Matthew's Crombie Halls of Residence at the University, completed in 1960, were listed at Category A in 2004. Other A-listed structures include a rare surviving locomotive turntable, an early suspension bridge by Samuel Brown, the intact Victorian Tivoli Theatre, and Scotland's oldest iron-framed mill building.

Listed buildings 

|}

See also
 Scheduled monuments in Aberdeen

Notes

References

External links

Aberdeen
 
Category A listed buildings